is a Japanese kickboxer currently fighting in K-1, where he is the K-1 Bantamweight champion. He is the 2021 K-1 Japan Bantamweight Grand Prix and 2022 K-1 World Bantamweight Grand Prix winner.

Combat Press ranks him as the No. 5 strawweight in the world, as of August 2021. Between June and July 2021, he was ranked as the No. 7 Flyweight kickboxer in the world.

Kickboxing career

K-1

Early career
Kuroda made his professional debut against Yuta Kuwata at KHAOS 4. Kuroda won the fight by a first-round technical knockout. Kuroda was scheduled to fight KING Tsubasa at DEEP KICK 38, fifteen months after his first fight. He won the fight by majority decision.

Kuroda was scheduled to fight Aoi Noda at the K-1 World GP 2019 Japan vs World: 5 vs 5 & Special Superfight in Osaka event. The fight ended in a majority draw, with two of the judges scoring the fight a 29–29 draw, while the third judge scored the fight 30–29 in Kuroda's favor. The two of them were scheduled to fight a rematch at Krush 108, which Kuroda won by a 43-second knockout. Kuroda suffered his first professional loss at Krush 115, as he lost an extra round decision to Koki.

2020 Krush Bantamweight Tournament
Kuroda was scheduled to participate in the 2020 Krush Bantamweight tournament, organized to crown the Krush Banatamweight champion. The title was previously held by Junki Sasaki, who vacated the belt after moving up to super bantamweight. Kuroda was scheduled to fight Kazuma Takuda in the quarterfinalsm at Krush 118. Takuda spent the majority of fight focusing on his kicks, while Kuroda more consistently combined his kicks and punches. Kuroda won the quarterfinal bout by unanimous decision, with scores of 30–29, 30-29 and 30–28. Advancing to the semifinals, Kuroda was scheduled to fight the tournament favorite Begin Yoshioka, at Krush 120. Kuroda lost the fight by unanimous decision, with scores of 30–28, 30-28 and 29–28. Yoshioka would go on to win the tournament.

2021 K-1 Japan Bantamweight Grand Prix
Kuroda was scheduled to take part in the 2021 K-1 Japan Grand Prix. He was scheduled to fight Koji Ikeda in the tournament quarterfinals. During a pre-fight interview, Kuroda stated his desire to face the reigning Krush Bantamweight champion Kazuki Miburo in the finals. Miburo was scheduled to compete in the opposite side of the bracket. Kuroda managed to knock Ikeda down at the very end of the first round, after landing a counter left-straight to Ikeda's front kick. Ikeda came out attempting to pressure in the second round, but was knocked out with a flying knee 50 second into the round. Advancing to the semifinals, Kuroda faced Hinata Matsumoto. Although he wasn't able to knock Matsumoto out, Kuroda scored a knockdown in both the first and second round. He won the fight by unanimous decision, with scores of 30–25, 30-26 and 30–26. In the tournament finals, Kuroda fought the Krush Bantamweight champion Kazuki Miburo. He made quick work of the champion, knocking him out with a left cross, after just 31 seconds.

2022 K-1 World Bantamweight Grand Prix
Kuroda was scheduled to fight a rematch with Kazuki Miburo at K-1 World GP 2021 Japan on December 4, 2021. The pair fought five months prior, in the finals of the K-1 Japan Bantamweight Tournament, with Kuroda winning by knockout. Kuroda was once again victorious, as he won the fight by unanimous decision, after an extra round was fought. Kuroda next faced the 2021 Dead or Alive Bantamweight Tournament winner Kazane Nagai at The Match 2022, the K-1 and RISE cross-promotional event, on June 19, 2022. He lost the fight by unanimous decision, after an extra fourth round was fought, as the bout was ruled a split decision draw following the first three rounds.

On October 14, it was revealed that Kuroda was one of eight participants in the 2022 K-1 Bantamweight World Grand Prix. He was booked to face the Yodsila Chor.Hapayak in the quarterfinals of the one-day tournament, which was held at K-1 World GP 2022 in Osaka on December 3, 2022. The fight was ruled a split decision draw after the first three rounds, with scores of 30–29, 29–30 and 30–30. Kuroda was awarded the unanimous decision following the extra fourth round and faced the former Krush Bantamweight champion Kazuki Miburo in the semifinals of the one-day tournament. He won the fight by majority decision, with two judges scoring the bout 30–28 and 30–29 in his favor, while the third judge scored it 30–30. Kuroda advanced to the tournament final, where he faced Issei Ishii for the inaugural K-1 Bantamweight (-53 kg) title. He won the fight by split decision, after an extension round was contested. In the post-fight press conference, Kuroda revealed that he suffered an arm injury the quarterfinal bout.

Titles and accomplishments

Professional
K-1
 2021 K-1 Bantamweight Japan Grand Prix Winner
 2022 K-1 Bantamweight World Grand Prix Winner
 2022 K-1 Bantamweight Championship

Awards
eFight.jp
Fighter of the Month (December 2022)

Amateur
DEEP KICK
2011 TOP RUN Junior -30 kg Champion
All Japan Glove Karate Federation
2012 All Japan Glove Karate Federation Elementary School Champion

Kickboxing record

|-  style="background:#cfc"
| 2022-12-03|| Win ||align=left| Issei Ishii ||  K-1 World GP 2022 in Osaka Bantamweight World Grand Prix, Final || Osaka, Japan || Ext.R Decision (Split)|| 4 || 3:00
|-
! style=background:white colspan=9 |
|-  style="background:#cfc"
| 2022-12-03|| Win ||align=left| Kazuki Miburo ||  K-1 World GP 2022 in Osaka Bantamweight World Grand Prix, Semi Final || Osaka, Japan || Decision (Majority) || 3 || 3:00
|-  style="background:#cfc"
| 2022-12-03|| Win||align=left| Yodsila Chor.Hapayak ||  K-1 World GP 2022 in Osaka Bantamweight World Grand Prix, Quarter Final || Osaka, Japan || Ext.R Decision (Unanimous)|| 4 || 3:00
|-  style="text-align:center; background:#fbb"
| 2022-06-19 || Loss||align=left| Kazane || THE MATCH 2022 || Tokyo, Japan || Ext.R Decision (Unanimous)|| 4||3:00
|-  style="text-align:center; background:#cfc"
| 2021-12-04 || Win || align=left| Kazuki Miburo || K-1 World GP 2021 in Osaka || Osaka, Japan || Ext.R Decision (Unanimous)  ||4  ||3:00 
|-
|-  style="text-align:center; background:#cfc;"
| 2021-05-30|| Win || align=left| Kazuki Miburo || K-1 World GP 2021: Japan Bantamweight Tournament, Final ||  Tokyo, Japan || KO (Left Cross) || 1 || 0:31
|-
! style=background:white colspan=9 |
|-  style="text-align:center; background:#cfc;"
| 2021-05-30||Win || align=left| Hinata Matsumoto || K-1 World GP 2021: Japan Bantamweight Tournament, Semi Final || Tokyo, Japan || Decision (Unanimous) || 3 ||3:00
|-  style="text-align:center; background:#cfc;"
| 2021-05-30||  Win || align=left| Koji Ikeda || K-1 World GP 2021: Japan Bantamweight Tournament, Quarter Final || Tokyo, Japan || KO (Flying Knee) || 2 || 2:10
|-  style="text-align:center; background:#fbb;"
| 2020-12-19|| Loss ||align=left| Begin Yoshioka || Krush.120 - Bantamweight Championship Tournament Semi Final || Tokyo, Japan || Decision (Unanimous) || 3||3:00
|-  style="text-align:center; background:#cfc;"
| 2020-10-17|| Win ||align=left| Kazuma Takuda || Krush.118 - Bantamweight Championship Tournament Quarter Final || Tokyo, Japan || Decision (Unanimous) || 3||3:00
|-  style="text-align:center; background:#fbb;"
| 2020-06-28|| Loss ||align=left| Koki || Krush 115 || Tokyo, Japan || Ext.R Decision (Unanimous) || 4 || 3:00
|-  style="text-align:center; background:#cfc;"
| 2019-11-16|| Win || align=left| Aoi Noda || Krush.108 || Osaka, Japan || TKO ||1 ||0:43
|-  style="text-align:center; background:#c5d2ea;"
| 2019-08-24|| Draw || align=left| Aoi Noda || K-1 World GP 2019 Japan vs World・5 vs 5 & Special Superfight in Osaka || Osaka, Japan || Decision ||3 || 3:00
|-  style="text-align:center; background:#cfc;"
| 2019-01-06|| Win || align=left| KING Tsubasa || DEEP KICK 38|| Osaka, Japan || Decision (Majority) ||3 ||3:00
|-  style="text-align:center; background:#cfc;"
| 2017-10-14|| Win || align=left| Yuta Kuwata || KHAOS 4|| Tokyo, Japan || TKO (Doctor Stoppage) ||1 ||2:12
|-
| colspan=9 | Legend:    

|-  style="background:#fbb;"
| 2018-07-29|| Loss|| align=left| Raito Tamagawa || K-1 Koshien Tournament, Quarter Final|| Tokyo, Japan || KO||1 ||
|-  style="background:#CCFFCC;"
| 2018-07-29|| Win || align=left| Yuki Maeda || K-1 Koshien Tournament, Second Round|| Tokyo, Japan || Decision (Split)|| 1 ||2:00
|-  style="background:#CCFFCC;"
| 2018-07-29|| Win || align=left| Tatsuya Yoshida || K-1 Koshien Tournament, First Round|| Tokyo, Japan || Decision (Unanimous)|| 1 ||2:00
|-  style="background:#cfc;"
| 2017-05-28|| Win || align=left| Yu Kinosada || NEXT LEVEL Kansai 39 || Sakai, Japan || KO || 1 || 0:44
|-  style="background:#fbb;"
| 2013-05-12|| Loss || align=left| Takasuke Sekimoto  || DEEP☆KICK 15 || Osaka, Japan || Decision (Unanimous)|| 3 || 2:00
|-  style="background:#cfc;"
| 2013-04-14|| Win || align=left| Koya Sugiura  || NEXT LEVEL Kansai 6 || Sakai, Japan || Decision (Unanimous)||  ||
|-  style="background:#cfc;"
| 2013-01-27|| Win || align=left| Shogo Tanaka  || NEXT LEVEL Kansai 4 || Sakai, Japan || Decision (Unanimous)||  ||
|-  style="background:#fbb;"
| 2012-12-16|| Loss || align=left| Shinya Hirota || NEXT LEVEL Kansai 3 || Osaka, Japan || Decision (Unanimous)||  ||
|-  style="background:#fbb;"
| 2012-09-23|| Loss || align=left| Takasuke Sekimoto || NEXT LEVEL Kansai 1 - Challenger Tournament, Final || Sakai, Japan || Decision (Majority)||  ||
|-  style="background:#cfc;"
| 2012-09-23|| Win || align=left| Aoshi Kitano || NEXT LEVEL Kansai 1 - Challenger Tournament, Semi Final || Sakai, Japan || Decision (Unanimous)||  ||
|-  style="background:#c5d2ea;"
| 2012-07-16|| Draw|| align=left| Haruki Ohno || NEXT LEVEL || Sakai, Japan || Decision||  ||
|-  style="background:#fbb;"
| 2012-05-06|| Loss|| align=left| Katsuya Aoki || NEXT LEVEL || Higashiosaka, Japan || TKO ||1 ||
|-  style="background:#cfc;"
| 2012-05-06|| Win|| align=left| Taito Suzuki || NEXT LEVEL || Higashiosaka, Japan || Decision (Unanimous)||  ||
|-  style="background:#fbb;"
| 2012-03-25|| Loss || align=left| Daiki Fujimoto || NEXT LEVEL || Habikino, Osaka, Japan || Decision (Majority)||  ||
|-  style="background:#cfc;"
| 2011-10-|| Win|| align=left| Kenshin Yurai|| AROUND 4 - Prince Tournament, Final || Japan || Decision (Unanimous)||  ||
|-  style="background:#cfc;"
| 2011-10-|| Win|| align=left| Shota Hirogaki|| AROUND 4 - Prince Tournament, Semi Final || Japan || Decision (Unanimous)||  ||
|-  style="background:#cfc;"
| 2011-10-|| Win|| align=left| Shuta Miyamoto || AROUND 4 - Prince Tournament, Quarter Final || Japan || Decision (Unanimous)||  ||
|-  style="background:#cfc;"
| 2011-10-23|| Win || align=left| Raimu Minato  || DEEP KICK 8 - TOP RUN 2|| Osaka, Japan || Decision (Majority)|| 3 || 2:00
|-
! style=background:white colspan=9 |
|-  style="background:#fbb;"
| 2011-04-10|| Loss || align=left| Ryo Mandokoro || DEEP KICK 6 - TOP RUN 1|| Osaka, Japan || Decision (Unanimous)|| 2 || 2:00
|-
! style=background:white colspan=9 |
|-
| colspan=9 | Legend:

See also
 List of male kickboxers

References

Living people
2000 births
Japanese male kickboxers
People from Yao, Osaka
Sportspeople from Osaka
Flyweight kickboxers